Mana Badi Nadu Nedu is a program launched by the Government of Andhra Pradesh to improve the learning outcomes and decrease the dropout rate in all schools by taking up various measures including upgrading the school infrastructure.

Development 
The scheme was launched by Chief minister of Andhra Pradesh, Y. S. Jagan Mohan Reddy on 14th November, 2019 with a budget of 12,000 crores for the years 2019-23. The project covers total 44,512 schools, including residential schools, run by all managements, viz. School Education, Panchayati Raj, Municipal Administration, Social Welfare, BC Welfare, Tribal Welfare, Minority Welfare, Juvenile Welfare and Fisheries Departments. 

In Phase-1, 15,715 schools have been taken up through the Government implementing agencies - Panchayat Raj Engineering Dept, AP Samagra Shiksha Society, APEWIDC, Municipal & Public Health Engineering Department and Tribal welfare Engineering Department.

The scheme 
Mana Badi – Nadu Nedu is to strengthen the infrastructure and transform the existing infrastructure of the schools in the mission mode in a phased manner over a period of three years, starting from 2019-20. Under Mana Badi – Nadu Nedu program, following 9 infrastructure components have been taken up: 

 Toilets with running water
 Drinking water supply
 Major and minor repairs
 Electrification with fans and tube lights
 Furniture for students and staff
 Green chalk boards
 Painting to schools
 English labs
 Compound walls.
 Additional Class Rooms

References

Government of Andhra Pradesh